Thomas Arnold was the member of Parliament for the constituency of Dover for the parliament of 1420 and May 1421; and was mayor, deputy mayor, and jurat of Dover.

References 

Members of the Parliament of England for Dover
Mayors of Dover
Year of birth unknown
Year of death unknown
English MPs 1420
English MPs May 1421